The Journal of Graph Algorithms and Applications is an open access peer-reviewed scientific journal covering the subject of graph algorithms and graph drawing. The journal was established in 1997 and the editor-in-chief is Giuseppe Liotta (University of Perugia). It is abstracted and indexed by Scopus and MathSciNet.

References

External links

Computer science journals
Mathematics journals
Graph algorithms
Graph drawing
Publications established in 1997
English-language journals
Open access journals